The New York Interschool Association Inc., is a consortium of eight independent schools in Manhattan that serves students, teachers, and administration.

Overview
The Interschool is designed primarily for the coming together of the eight Manhattan private schools to do interschool activities, and also to the widely known Faculty Diverse Search and the Teachers Fellows and posting resumes for one of the member and associated schools.

Teachers and professors may apply to any of the member or associated schools through Interschool.

History
Interschool's mission, in 1971, was to provide "school programming" to the single-sex independent schools in Manhattan.

Member school activities
From the Interschool's homepage:

Faculty Diverse Search
FDS seeks to recruit and select an outstanding pool of candidates of color for 25 New York City independent schools to consider for their faculty and administrative openings. Openings are for teachers of all grades, both entry-level and experienced. Openings for academic deans and division heads, technologists, librarians, learning specialists, counselors, admissions, and development officers require an advanced degree and two or more years of experience.

Fellows Program

The Interschool Fellows Program offers teachers in their first or second year of independent school teaching a program of support and guidance led by experienced teachers and administrators. The core of the program is a two-hour evening seminar on Tuesday evenings from late September to mid-March. The purpose of these seminars is to introduce teachers to the independent school community and to the challenges and rewards of the teaching profession.

Sessions are held in different schools and presenters are drawn from a wide pool of veteran teachers who address topics of interest to beginning teachers. In addition, each year the Fellows' group provides a supportive environment for individual members to share and exchange ideas and information. Topics addressed in the Fellows' sessions include: lesson planning, developing curriculum, teaching to different learning styles, partnering with parents, classroom use of technology, meeting the needs of a diverse student body, where to seek professional development. One of the highlights of the program is the chance to receive feedback from the program coordinators who observe each Fellow's class at least once a year.

Schools

Member schools
The eight member schools. All are located within Manhattan.

Brearley School
Browning School
Chapin School
Collegiate School
Dalton School
The Nightingale-Bamford School
Spence School
Trinity School

Associated schools
There are also a number associated schools. All are located within Manhattan unless otherwise noted.
Allen-Stevenson School
Berkeley Carroll School in Brooklyn
Birch Wathen Lenox School
Buckley School
Convent of the Sacred Heart
Calhoun School
Columbia Grammar and Preparatory School
Ethical Culture Fieldston School (partially in Riverdale, Bronx)
Friends Seminary
Grace Church School
Hewitt School
Horace Mann School in Riverdale, Bronx
Little Red School House and Elisabeth Irwin High School
Marymount School of New York
Packer Collegiate Institute in Brooklyn Heights, Brooklyn
Poly Prep Country Day School in Dyker Heights and Park Slope, Brooklyn
Riverdale Country School in Riverdale, Bronx
St. Bernard's School
St. David's School
St. Luke's School
Staten Island Academy Prep School in Todt Hill, Staten Island
 Stephen Gaynor School
The School at Columbia
Town School
Trevor Day School
Village Community School

See also

Ivy Preparatory School League

References

 

Education in Manhattan
United States schools associations